Townsville State Government Offices may refer to:
 Townsville State Government Offices (Flinders Street)
 Townsville State Government Offices (Wickham Street)